Uzbekistan Second League is the third highest football league in Uzbekistan.

Members of Uzbekistan Second League 2010

League format
In the second phase participated 9 teams split into two groups: Samarkand and Yangiyer. First two teams promoted to First League.

Second phase
Registon-S, FC Erkurgan, Chilonzor-Pakhtakor and FK Yangyier promoted to the First League

Group Samarkand

Group Yangiyer

References

External links
Championat.uz: Standings and results
pfl.uz: Uzbekistan Professional League

Uzbekistan Second League seasons
3